Opole County is a unit of territorial administration and local government (powiat) in Lublin Voivodeship, eastern Poland. It was established on January 1, 1999, as a result of the Polish local government reforms passed in 1998.

As of 2019, its total population is 59,511, including 9,144 in Poniatowa, 8,421 in Opole Lubelskie, 915 in Józefów nad Wisłą, and a rural population of 41,031.

Neighbouring counties
Opole County is bordered by Puławy County to the north, Lublin County to the east, Kraśnik County to the south-east, Opatów County to the south-west, Lipsko County to the west and Zwoleń County to the north-west.

Administrative division
The county is subdivided into seven gminas (three urban-rural and four rural). These are listed in the following table, in descending order of population.

References

 
Opole Lubelskie